FC New Orleans was an American amateur soccer team based in New Orleans, Louisiana.

The academy team was a provisional member of the National Premier Soccer League (NPSL) in 2012. They also competed in the 2014 LSA Adult State Cup.

History
FC New Orleans was established in June 2010 to provide accessibility to quality soccer training for urban youth living in the Gentilly, Eastern New Orleans and St. Bernard Parish areas of the New Orleans Metro Area.  It has since evolved into a club structure that includes beginner training for youths as young as 4 years old to adults in both recreational and Semi-Professional competitions. 

On June 13, 2012, the NPSL accepted FC New Orleans as an expansion club for their 2012 season. However, the club was made a provisional member after registering past the league deadline for the 2012 season. FC New Orleans played one season and finished with a 2-0-1 record.

Stadium
 FC New Orleans Field (2012)

Players and staff

Staff
  Steven Morris – Youth Head Coach

Players

Record

Year-by-year

References

Soccer clubs in New Orleans
National Premier Soccer League teams
Association football clubs established in 2012
2012 establishments in Louisiana